Neo19 is a shopping mall in Xinyi Special District, Taipei, Taiwan that opened on 27 October 2001. Main core stores of the shopping mall include shops, restaurants, nightclubs and a gym. The Nike store is located on the first floor, while the American chain restaurant Chili's is on the second floor along with VeryThai, Mo-Mo-Paradise and Mala-1 Hot Pot. Fitness Factory is located on the fourth floor. Ikon, Huckleberry, and Klash nightclubs are all located in B1 and the fifth floor houses another nightclub called Cocco & Co and bar called Barcode.

Incidents
On 13 May 2021, Neo19 closed down for disinfection when the Taiwan Centers for Disease Control announced that a person who had tested positive for COVID-19 had visited and dined in a barbecue restaurant inside the shopping mall.

See also
 List of tourist attractions in Taiwan
 List of shopping malls in Taipei

References

External links

2001 establishments in Taiwan
Shopping malls in Taipei
Shopping malls established in 2001